Gyroporus umbrinosquamosus is a species of bolete fungus in the family Gyroporaceae. Found in North America, it was first described scientifically by mycologist William Alphonso Murrill in 1939.

References

External links

Boletales
Fungi described in 1939
Fungi of North America
Taxa named by William Alphonso Murrill